Augustine John Daly was a Massachusetts politician who served as the Mayor of Cambridge, Massachusetts.

In 1903, Daly ran as a non-partisan candidate for mayor. In the December 1903 election Daly defeated Democratic party incumbent mayor John H. H. McNamee by 70 votes.

Personal life 
Augustine married Mary Margaret McCarthy.

Notes

1938 deaths
Mayors of Cambridge, Massachusetts
Year of birth missing